UNC Health is a not-for-profit medical system owned by the State of North Carolina and based in Chapel Hill, North Carolina at the University of North Carolina at Chapel Hill. It provides services throughout the Research Triangle and North Carolina.  UNC Health was created in 1998, when the North Carolina General Assembly passed legislation that established the UNC Health Care System, bringing under one entity UNC Hospitals and the clinical programs of the UNC School of Medicine.  In 2018, the system reported over 3.5 million outpatient visits and over 500,000 emergency visits.

History
The first hospital in what later became known as UNC Hospitals and the UNC Health Care System was North Carolina Memorial Hospital, which opened on Sept. 2, 1952. Then in 1989, the North Carolina General Assembly created the University of North Carolina Hospitals entity as a unifying organization to govern constituent hospitals.

Today, UNC Health consists of UNC Medical Center, Rex Healthcare, Chatham Hospital, Caldwell Memorial Hospital, Johnston Health, Pardee Hospital, Nash Health Care, Wayne Memorial Hospital, UNC Lenoir Health Care and UNC Health Rockingham. In addition, UNC Health Care includes UNC Faculty Physicians (the practice group serving UNC Hospitals) and the UNC Physicians Network (a wholly owned subsidiary of UNC Health that owns and operates community-based practices that provide primary and specialty care throughout the North Carolina Triangle area.). UNC Hospitals include the NC Memorial Hospital, NC Children's Hospital, NC Women's Hospital, NC Cancer Hospital (clinical home of the UNC Lineberger Comprehensive Cancer Center), and the NC Neurosciences Hospital. Construction of a new $20 million office/hospital complex in Hillsborough, NC began in April 2011. As of July 2015, many services are now offered at the Hillsborough campus, including an emergency department and general surgery.

UNC Health and Charlotte-based Atrium Health announced August 31, 2017 that the systems had signed a letter of intent (LOI) to join their clinical enterprises and collaborate to enhance medical education and research. Under the LOI, the two organizations agreed to start a period of exclusive negotiations, with the goal of entering into final agreements by the end of the year. Their goal is to form a new organization through a joint operating company structure. Executives of both systems said a larger network would improve the ability to negotiate with insurance companies and provide other cost reductions. The letter of intent signed August 30, 2017 said that if the proposed partnership was approved, UNC Health Care CEO Bill Roper would become executive chairman and Carolinas Healthcare CEO Gene Woods would be CEO of the new organization. However, questions about who would control the combined system led Atrium to back out of talks in March 2018.

On October 25, 2017, Wake Forest Baptist Medical Center and High Point Regional Health System announced that Wake Forest Baptist would take over High Point Regional, a part of UNC Health since 2013, by Summer 2018.

References

Teaching hospitals in North Carolina
Healthcare in North Carolina
Health Care
Hospital networks in the United States
1952 establishments in North Carolina
Buildings and structures in Chapel Hill-Carrboro, North Carolina
Medical and health organizations based in North Carolina